Smt. Shanti Devi Law College is situated in Rewari, Haryana, India. It is affiliated to the Maharshi Dayanand University at Rohtak.

References

Law schools in Haryana
Rewari district
Educational institutions established in 2008
2008 establishments in Haryana